Chrysothamnus, known as rabbitbrush, rabbitbush, and chamisa, are a genus of shrubs in the family Asteraceae. The native distribution is in the arid western United States, Canada, and northern Mexico. It is known for its bright white or yellow flowers in late summer.

The leaves are alternate, sessile or with short petioles, with entire edges. The flowerheads are singular or in clusters. Each composite flower often has five to 6 (though sometimes upwards of 40) yellow disc florets and no ray florets. 

Chrysothamnus species are used as food plants by the larvae of some Lepidoptera species including Coleophora linosyridella, Coleophora viscidiflorella (which have both been recorded on C. viscidiflorus) and Schinia walsinghami.

 Species
 Chrysothamnus depressus – dwarf rabbitbrush, longflower rabbitbrush – California Nevada Arizona Utah Colorado New Mexico 
 Chrysothamnus eremobius – pintwater rabbitbrush, remote rabbitbrush – Nevada
 Chrysothamnus greenei – Greene's rabbitbrush – California Nevada Arizona Utah Colorado New Mexico Wyoming 
 Chrysothamnus humilis – Truckee rabbitbrush – California Nevada Oregon Washington Idaho 
 Chrysothamnus molestus – Arizona rabbitbrush – Arizona 
 Chrysothamnus scopulorum – Arizona Utah 
 Chrysothamnus stylosus – Arizona Utah 
 Chrysothamnus vaseyi – Vasey's rabbitbrush – Arizona Utah New Mexico Colorado Wyoming 
 Chrysothamnus viscidiflorus – yellow rabbitbrush – British Columbia Washington Oregon California Arizona Nevada Idaho Montana Wyoming Utah Colorado New Mexico South Dakota Nebraska

References

External links
 CalFlora Database: Chrysothamnus (rabbitbrush)
 Jepson Manual Treatment of Chrysothamnus
 

Astereae
Asteraceae genera
Flora of the Western United States
Taxa named by Thomas Nuttall